Alex Gilbert may refer to:
Alex Gilbert (adoption advocate) (born 1992), New Zealand adoption advocate, writer and presenter. 
Alex Gilbert (basketball) (born 1957), American basketball player
Alex Gilbert (footballer) (born 2001), Irish footballer